NacNac is a class of anionic bidentate ligands. 1,3-Diketimines are often referred to as "HNacNac", a modification of the abbreviation Hacac used for 1,3-diketones. These species can exist as a mixture of tautomers.

Preparation of ligands and complexes
Acetylacetone and related 1,3-diketones condense with primary alkyl- or arylamines resulting in replacement of the carbonyl oxygen atoms with NR groups, where R = aryl, alkyl. To prepare 1,3-diketimines from bulky amines, e.g. 2,4,6-trimethylanilines, prolonged reaction times are required.  2,6-Diisopropylaniline is a common bulky building block.

Deprotonation of HNacNac compounds affords anionic bidentate ligands that form a variety of coordination complexes. Some derivatives with large R groups can be used to stabilize low valent main group and transition metal complexes.  Unlike the situation for the acetylacetonates, the steric properties of the coordinating atoms in NacNac− ligands is adjustable by changes in the R substituent.  Attachment to a metal center is usually carried out by initial deprotonation of HNacNac with n-butyllithium; the lithium derivative is then treated with a metal chloride to eliminate lithium chloride.  In some cases, HNacNacs also serve as charge-neutral 1,3-diimine ligands.

Related NacNac ligands

NacNac ligands are diimine analogues of acetylacetonate ligands. An intermediate class of ligands are derived from monoimino-ketones.The first Dipp-NacNac ligand was synthesized by Dr. Francis S. Mair in 1998.

See also
Diimine

References

Ligands
Coordination chemistry